Gyvatn is a lake in Agder county, Norway. The lake straddles the borders of the three municipalities of Åseral, Bygland and Evje og Hornnes.

See also
List of lakes in Norway

References

Lakes of Agder
Evje og Hornnes
Bygland
Åseral